Rubus bifrons, the European blackberry or Himalayan blackberry, is a European species of flowering plant in the rose family. It is widespread across much of Europe and naturalized in scattered parts of North America. It is sometimes considered to include the species R. armeniacus.

Rubus bifrons is a spiny shrub up to 50 cm (20 inches) tall. Stems are biennial, arching, sometimes creeping. Leaves are palmately compound with three or five leaflets. Flowers are white or pink, in large arrays at the ends of branches, sometimes containing as many as 100 flowers. Fruits are black.

References

External links
 

bifrons
Plants described in 1821
Flora of Europe